Events in the year 1950 in Turkey.

Parliament
 8th Parliament of Turkey (up to 2 May)
 9th Parliament of Turkey

Incumbents
President 
İsmet İnönü (up to 20 May June)
 Celal Bayar (from 20 May June)
Prime Minister 
Şemsettin Günaltay (up to 2 June)
Adnan Menderes (from 2 June)
Leader of the opposition 
Celal Bayar (up to 20 May)
İsmet İnönü (from 2 June)

Ruling party and the main opposition
  Ruling party
 Republican People's Party (CHP) (up to 2 June)
 Democrat Party (DP) (from 2 June)
  Main opposition 
 Democrat Party (DP) (up to 2 June) 
 Republican People's Party (CHP) (from 2 June)

Cabinet
18th government of Turkey (up to 2 June)
19th government of Turkey (from 2 June)

Events
11 April – Demonstrations in the funeral ceremony of Fevzi Çakmak
14 May – General elections, winner takes all system ( DP 396 seats, CHP 68 seats, MP 1 seat, Indep.7 seats)
16 July – Ezan (call for prayer) which had been translated into Turkish during the CHP governments was restored to traditional Arabic.
3 September – Local elections
21 September – Turkish Brigade to Korean War was sent off to Korea.
 22 October – Census (population 20,947,188)
27 November – Beginning of the Battle of Wawon (Kunuri) in Korea in which Turkish brigade distinguished itself.(237 deaths and 825 total casualties)

Births
1 January – Şükrü Sina Gürel, former government minister
17 February – Haluk Günözgen, cyclist
22 February – Seyit Kırmızı, cyclist 
1 March – Bülent Ortaçgil, singer
17 March – Mehmet Ali İrtemçelik, former government minister
20 October – Abdullah Gül, former president

Deaths
2 April – Recep Peker (born in 1889), former prime minister (15th government of Turkey)
10 April – Fevzi Çakmak (born in 1876), former chief of staff and the only marshal of the Turkish army (after the death of Kemal Atatürk)
1 October – Faik Ali Ozansoy (born in 1876), politician and poet
2 November - Huriye Öniz (born in 1887) - one of the first female MPs.
15 November – Orhan Veli Kanık (born in 1914), poet

Gallery

References

 
Years of the 20th century in Turkey
Turkey
Turkey
Turkey